Le migliori is an album by Italian singers Mina and Adriano Celentano, issued on November 11, 2016. The first single "Amami amami" was released on October 21, 2016.
Le migliori was the best-selling album in 2016 in Italy. It sold 340,000 copies, getting the 6× Platinum certification.

Background
In March 2015, rumors began in the Italian press of another collaboration between Adriano Celentano and Mina following their 1998 successful album Mina Celentano. Celentano himself hinted at the possibility when he posted a message on his blog to congratulate Mina on her 75th birthday. On October 20, 2015, it was officially confirmed that the two artists would indeed be releasing a new album. At the time of the announcement, the album was scheduled to be released in the spring of 2016. As reported by the Corriere della Sera, recordings began in early summer 2015 and would take place in both Adriano Celentano's studio in Galbiate and Mina's studio in Lugano. The official release date of Le Migliori was finally set for November 11, 2016.

The album's title comes from a quote by Celentano on his blog speaking of their collaboration, meaning "(we are) the best ones". Surprisingly, Celentano used the first feminin plural. For this reason the cover artwork show Mina and Celentano in their younger and older version, with the latter in drag.

Track listing

Charts

Weekly charts

Year-end charts

Certifications and sales

Notes

2016 albums
Mina (Italian singer) albums
Adriano Celentano albums